William Lowndes may refer to:

 William Lowndes (1652–1724), British politician and Secretary to the Treasury
 William Lowndes (1752-1828), British lawyer, parliamentary draftsman and Chief Commissioner of the Board of Taxes
 William Lowndes (congressman) (1782–1822), U.S. Congressman from South Carolina
 William Selby Lowndes (c. 1767–1840), British Member of Parliament
 William Thomas Lowndes (c. 1798–1843), English bibliographer, whose principal work was The Bibliographer’s Manual of English Literature